Saint Frederick of Hallum (West Frisian: Freark fan Hallum) (c. 1113 – March 5, 1175) was a Premonstratensian priest and regular canon, founder and first abbot of Mariengaarde Abbey in Friesland in the Netherlands.

He was also the parish priest of Hallum, his birthplace, and founder of Bethlehem Abbey for Premonstratensian canonesses.

He died and was buried at Mariengaarde but in 1614, to save his relics from the Calvinists, they were removed and taken to Bonne-Espérance Abbey near Estinnes in Belgium, where they were reinterred in 1616 or 1617. They were transferred to Leffe Abbey near Dinant in 1938.

His feast day, celebrated by the Premonstratensian Order and in the Archdiocese of Utrecht, is 4 February.

Sources
 
 Norbertine Vocations: St. Frederick

1110s births
1175 deaths
12th-century Christian saints
Dutch Roman Catholic saints
Premonstratensians
People from Ferwerderadiel